Samuel S. Fifield (June 24, 1839February 17, 1915) was a Wisconsin politician and influential businessperson. The Town of Fifield in Price County, Wisconsin is named after him.

Biography

He was born in Corinna, Maine, in 1839 and received an education as a printer. He moved to Wisconsin in 1854, where he worked as a clerk on a steamboat on the St. Croix River. He founded the Polk County Press in 1861.

After the American Civil War, he entered politics and served as a Sergeant-at-Arms for the Wisconsin State Assembly in 1871 and 1872. He later served as a Republican member of the Assembly from 1874 through 1876, serving as speaker the last year. He was elected to the Wisconsin State Senate in 1876, to fill the vacancy caused by the resignation of Henry D. Barron. He served in the state senate until 1881, at which time he was elected as Wisconsin's 14th Lieutenant Governor.

He lived in Ashland from 1872, and helped found the Ashland Press newspaper. He was the chairman of the first board of supervisors in June 1872.

After retiring from politics in 1887, he served as postmaster in Ashland, and opened a summer resort on Sand Island in Lake Superior. Named Camp Stella, after Fifield's wife, the camp was one of the first successful resorts in northern Wisconsin. The site is now within the boundaries of the Apostle Islands National Lakeshore; many of the buildings are still standing, and one, the Sevona Memorial Cottage, is listed on the National Register of Historic Places.

Fifield died in 1915 at his home in Ashland. In Ashland, there is a street of historic homes named Fifield Row in his honor.

References 

1839 births
1915 deaths
People from Corinna, Maine
People from Ashland, Wisconsin
People from Polk County, Wisconsin
Businesspeople from Wisconsin
Employees of the Wisconsin Legislature
Republican Party Wisconsin state senators
Lieutenant Governors of Wisconsin
19th-century American politicians
Speakers of the Wisconsin State Assembly
Republican Party members of the Wisconsin State Assembly
19th-century American businesspeople